Marker is an American drama television series that premiered on UPN on January 17 and ended on May 16, 1995. It is set in and was filmed in Hawaii.

Synopsis
The series' plot is about Richard DeMorra (played by Richard Grieco), a carpenter who travels to Hawaii to claim the estate of his estranged father after his father's death. Most of the father's estate was instead willed to his widow, Kimba (Gates McFadden). To claim his share of the estate, DeMorra must travel and redeem "markers": tokens distributed by his father which correspond to good deeds. Many of these good deeds correspond to detective work, such as in the first episode, where DeMorra is asked to locate a surfer's missing sister.

Cast
Richard Grieco as Richard DeMorra 
Gates McFadden as Kimba
Andy Bumatai as Danny Kahala

Episodes

References

External links
 
 review from the Milwaukee Journal

UPN original programming
1990s American drama television series
1995 American television series debuts
1995 American television series endings
Television series by CBS Studios
Television shows set in Hawaii
Television series by Stephen J. Cannell Productions
Television shows filmed in Hawaii